The 1989 Peach Bowl took place on December 30, 1989. The competing teams were Syracuse and Georgia.

Background
Syracuse was in a bowl game for the 3rd straight year, which was also their first Peach Bowl ever. Georgia had a streak of winning and losing through the season, winning the first two games, losing the next three, winning four straight, and then losing two straight games to the end the season tied with Florida and Ole Miss while Alabama, Tennessee & Auburn (the latter two having beat Georgia) all shared the Southeastern Conference title, in Goff's first year at the program. This was Georgia's 10th straight bowl appearance, along with their first Peach Bowl since 1973.

Game summary
 Georgia – Warner 5-yard touchdown pass from Talley (Kasay kick), 10:34 remaining in the 1st quarter
 Syracuse – Owens 1-yard touchdown run (Biskup kick), 6:07 remaining in the 1st quarter
 Georgia – Kasay 20-yard field goal, 12:53 remaining in the 2nd quarter
 Georgia – Safety on ball centered through endzone, 9:52 remaining in the 3rd quarter
 Georgia – Hampton 4-yard touchdown pass from Talley (pass failed), 7:39 remaining in the 3rd quarter
 Syracuse – Biskup 32-yard field goal, 1:44 remaining in the 3rd quarter
 Syracuse – Moore 19-yard touchdown pass from McDonald (pass failed), 10:08 remaining in the 4th quarter
 Syracuse – Biskup 26-yard field goal, 1:08 remaining in the 4th quarter
Owens rushed for 112 yards on 14 carries for Syracuse. For Georgia, Hampton rushed for 32 yards on 14 carries. Mo Lewis returned an interception 77 yards, a Peach Bowl record.

Statistics

Aftermath
Syracuse would go to three straight bowl games, and go to five more in the next decade. Georgia went through a patch in which they went to three bowl games in Goff's six remaining years. Georgia returned to the Peach Bowl in 1995, in the final game for Goff before he was fired. Syracuse hasn't returned to the Peach Bowl since this game.

References

Peach Bowl
Peach Bowl
Syracuse Orange football bowl games
Georgia Bulldogs football bowl games
Peach Bowl
December 1989 sports events in the United States